Lanesboro Correctional Institution is a state men's prison in Polkton, North Carolina, first opened in January, 2004 and operated by the North Carolina Department of Public Safety Adult Corrections.  As one of the state's four largest prisons, the official capacity is 1,800 prisoners.  The facility houses medium- and close-security inmates.  

As of March 2012 Lanesboro was one of six state prisons put on lockdown to squelch gang fights and coordinated gang activity.  

As of May 2016, state corrections officials announced that the Lanesboro facility would be merged with the adjacent Brown Creek Correctional Institution, which is to be converted from medium to minimum security.  The move is meant to address staffing challenges and the "checkered pasts" of both facilities.

Notable inmates
Robert Stewart (born 1963), mass murderer; perpetrator of the 2009 Carthage nursing home shooting

References 

Prisons in North Carolina
Buildings and structures in Anson County, North Carolina
2004 establishments in North Carolina